Mushroom Lake is a small alpine lake is located in the Gabral Valley of Kalam Swat. Mushroom Lake is called Mushroom because of its mushroom-shaped structure. It is Ten hours hike from Shahi Bagh Kalam.

Mushroom lake located in upper shahi bagh valley of swat, this is high alpine lake around 13500 feet above sea level. The awe-inspiring lake is located about 31 kilometres away from Utror and 20 kilometres from Shahi Bagh.

Google Map location is 35°38'9.54"N 72°17'47.77"E

See also
 List of Tourist attractions in Swat
Mahodand Lake - Kalam Valley
Kundol Lake - Kalam Valley
Daral Lake - Swat Valley

References

External links 
 Google Map location

Videos
 Mushroom Lake, Swat, Pakistan - YouTube
 مشروم جھیل، سوات (The Majestic Mushroom Lake, Swat) - YouTube
 Mushroom Lake Shahibagh | Swat Valley | Beauty of Pakistan - YouTube

Tourist attractions in Swat
Lakes of Khyber Pakhtunkhwa
Swat District